Maha Ali Kazmi is a Pakistani singer-songwriter who was born and grew up in Karachi and is of Kashmiri descent. She completed her higher education from Monash University, Melbourne Australia, and upon returning to Pakistan she began her musical career as the back-up vocalist for Cornetto Music Icons in 2013. She released her debut single "Nazar" soon after.

Early life

Maha Ali Kazmi was born in Karachi, Pakistan to Ali Asghar Raza, a civil engineer of Kashmiri descent and Fatima Ali Asghar. Music is a heritage passed down to her from the Hindustani classical artist Wajid Ali Shah, the ancestor from her mother's side.

She started singing and joined her very first underground band at the age of 16 in Karachi However, after graduating high school she decided to pursue her education and moved to Melbourne.

Career

Upon completion of her studies she returned to Karachi soon after which she auditioned for Cornetto Music Icons and thereupon ex- Vital Signs' Shahi Hasan selected her as a backup vocalist for the show which was aired on ARY Digital. This experience gave her exposure to working alongside some of the biggest names in the music industry in Pakistan, namely Rahat Fateh Ali, Ali Azmat, Strings and Alamgir to name a few.

She released her debut single, Nazar, produced by Farhad Humayun, the front man and drummer of Lahore based band Overload in 2013
   
Her second single Jana Nahi, produced by Shahi Hasan was released in 2014.

She has since released a number of singles which have been very well received including a collaboration with guitar maestro Aamir Zaki in the form of a song called Aaj Sun Ke Tumara Naam which was released on his one-month death anniversary as a tribute to the Pakistani guitarist. Maha Ali Kazmi is a Kashmiri state subject and she has represented the Kashmiri people in a number of TV shows including Bakhabar Savera of ARY News, Geo News and Samaa TV. 

In 2020, Maha Ali Kazmi featured in We Are One (global collaboration song) produced by Kashan Admani. We Are One featured 40 artists from 7 countries all coming together to give a message of hope during Covid-19 Pandemic. The song also featured Grammy Award-winning American violinist Charlie Bisharat, who has earlier played for the soundtracks of countless Hollywood movies including Titanic and Transformers; Grammy nominee Simon Philips; bass virtuoso Stu Hamm; and percussionist Gumbi Ortiz from the US, to name a few.

Discography

Singles

Covers
"Bhool Na (Original song by Pakistani band Sequencers") (2015)
Sahibo - Acoustic Station (2019)

References

External links
 Maha Ali Kazmi on Facebook
Maha Ali Kazmi on Instagram
Maha Ali Kazmi on SoundCloud
Maha Ali Kazmi on IMDb

 

Year of birth missing (living people)
Living people
Pakistani women singers
Singers from Karachi
Monash University alumni
Kashmiri people
Pakistani people of Kashmiri descent
Pakistani emigrants to Australia
English-language singers from Pakistan